Slow Chocolate Autopsy: Incidents from the Notorious Career of Norton, Prisoner of London is a 1997 novel by Iain Sinclair and illustrated by Dave McKean. It concerns Norton who is trapped in space, within London's city limits, but not in time.

Plot summary
The book is in twelve parts, each one featuring Norton (nine of which are in the form of stories and three as a mixture of illustrations and photo-strips). His adventures include participating in the death of Christopher Marlowe, the Ripper murders, as well as more recent events that have shaped London.

Genre
The book can be considered an example of psychogeography, which explores the specific effects of the geographical environment on the emotions and behavior of individuals.

In other media

Comics
Iain Sinclair's friend Alan Moore has included the character of Andrew Norton, the Prisoner of London, in The League of Extraordinary Gentlemen, Volume III: Century. The character's physical appearance here is based on that of Sinclair himself.

References

External links
 Complete Review Page

1997 British novels
Works by Ian Sinclair
Novels set in London